Dehydrodolichyl diphosphate synthase is an enzyme that in humans is encoded by the DHDDS gene.

Function 

Dehydrodolichyl diphosphate (dedol-PP) synthase catalyzes cis-prenyl chain elongation to produce the polyprenyl backbone of dolichol, a glycosyl carrier lipid required for the biosynthesis of several classes of glycoproteins.

Clinical significance 

It has been suggested that missense mutations in the DHDDS gene are responsible for certain variants of retinitis pigmentosa. Since it is involved in the early steps of dolichol synthesis, vital e.g. for correct N-glycosylation, a disease caused by mutations in DHDDS should be considered a congenital disorder of glycosylation (and named DHDDS-CDG according to the novel nomenclature of CDGs). Many CDG subtypes present with retinitis pigmentosa as a major feature.

References

Further reading

External links
  GeneReviews/NCBI/NIH/UW entry on Retinitis Pigmentosa Overview

EC 2.5.1